Torchlight may refer to:

 Light given off by a torch
 Torchlight, a 2009 action role-playing game
 Torchlight II, a 2012 action role-playing game
 Torchlight III, a 2020 action role-playing game
 Torchlight (1985 film), a 1985 American film
 Torchlight (2018 film), a 2018 Indian film
 Torchlight, Kentucky, United States
 "Torchlight (song)" by Missy Higgins, 2017